Thyretes monteiroi is a moth in the family Erebidae. It was described by Arthur Gardiner Butler in 1876. It is found in Angola and the Democratic Republic of the Congo.

References

Arctiidae genus list at Butterflies and Moths of the World of the Natural History Museum

Moths described in 1876
Syntomini